Rose City Book Pub is a bookstore and bar in Portland, Oregon.

Description and history 

Owner Elise Schumock started the bookstore and bar Rose City Book Pub in 2018, with 7,000–8,000 used books available for sale. She opened the business on  Fremont Street in northeast Portland's Sabin neighborhood, in a space which had previously housed County Cork. Some funds were raised via Indiegogo. The menu has included soup and sandwiches, with gluten-free and vegan options, as well as beer and wine.

Elise Herron of Willamette Week wrote, "Rose City Book Pub has all the makings of a Portland cliché—craft brews, staged poetry readings, rows of old and obscure books and bargoers chatting in hushed tones about their favorite James Joyce and Virginia Woolf novels. But don't be deterred by appearances. The simple bar manages to fuse two of the city's trademarks—beer and used books—without a drip of pretension."

During the COVID-19 pandemic, Schumock applied for but did not receive Restaurant Revitalization Fund support from the Small Business Administration.

See also 

 List of independent bookstores in the United States
 Used bookstore

References

External links

 

2018 establishments in Oregon
Independent bookstores of the United States
Drinking establishments in Oregon
Restaurants established in 2018
Restaurants in Portland, Oregon
Sabin, Portland, Oregon